Minbu Township is a township of Minbu District in the Magway Region of Myanmar.  The principal town is Minbu.

The township is home to the Shwe Settaw Pagoda, which holds an annual pagoda festival from the fifth waning day of Tabodwe to the Burmese New Year, attracting 100,000 pilgrims nationwide.

Townships of Magway Region